Suburban Noize Presents: Sub-Noize Rats is the third official compilation album by Suburban Noize Records released on September 2, 2003.

Track listing

References

2003 compilation albums
Suburban Noize Records compilation albums
Hip hop compilation albums
Alternative rock compilation albums